The men's beach volleyball tournament at the 2006 Asian Games was held from December 2 to December 11, 2006, in Doha, Qatar.

Schedule
All times are Arabia Standard Time (UTC+03:00)

Results

Double elimination round

Round 1

Round 2

Rank 17

Round 3

Rank 13

Rank 9

Round 4

Rank 7

Rank 5

Knockout round

Final standing

References

Results
Bracket

External links
Official website

Beach Men